Peebles Corporation is a privately held real estate investment and development company. The company was founded by Roy Donahue Peebles in 1983 specializing in residential, hospitality, retail, and mixed-use commercial properties.

Developments
Select developments include 2100 Martin Luther King, Jr. in Washington, D.C. and Courtyard by Marriott Hotel and Convention Center in D.C..

Broward County Convention Center - Broward County, Florida  (Award Cancelled)

The Peebles Corporation attempted to build a hotel and convention center pursuant to a City bid. However, after Wyndham hotels backed out of its deal with Peebles, Peebles was unable to secure a hotel partner.

After "four years of wrangling", Peebles failed to break ground on a convention center in Broward County. Peebles would eventually sue Broward County for costs, but Peebles claims were denied by a court.

Aqueduct Casino - Queens, New York  (Award Cancelled)

Although initially viewed as a potentially successful casino candidate, The Peebles Corporation was unable to secure and develop the Aqueduct Casino project in Queens, New York. The Peebles Corporation had support from local councilmembers, but was unable to win broader support from voters.

Peebles was one of several failed bidders at the Aqueduct Casino in New York; Peebles was deemed "unknowingly impotent" by the New York State committee formed to evaluate bids. Later, the New York State Office of the Investigator General would say that Peebles attempted to "fix the bid" with illegal campaign contributions.

Long Island Community Hospital - Brooklyn, New York  (Award rescinded after litigation)

Peebles bid on the LICH hospital site and failed to come to terms with the RFP proposal submitted; as with many Peebles deals, he alleged the site was environmentally uncertain and SUNY stopped negotiating with Peebles after it was revealed Peebles had engaged in bad faith negotiations.

In a Press Release, SUNY stated:
"Unfortunately, several portions of the Peebles proposal have dramatically changed, including the possibility of long delays in the manner and method in which health care will be provided at the site," SUNY spokesman David Doyle said: "Additionally, Peebles is seeking a cost-sharing agreement in which taxpayers would be partially responsible for environmental remediation, which is far outside the scope of the RFP. These deviations from the initial proposal are unacceptable to SUNY from both a health care and business perspective."

Peebles filed a lawsuit and bid protest against SUNY, however, the New York State Office of the Comptroller found The Peebles Corporation's bid protest to be without merit.

108 Leonard - New York, New York (Condo Sales Pending)

In 2013, Peebles and El-Ad Group acquired 346 Broadway (also known as 108 Leonard and the Former New York Life Insurance Company Building) for $160 million, the largest disposition ever undertaken by the New York City Economic Development Corporation. Development plans for the Renaissance Revival landmark and former New York Life Insurance Building include luxury condominiums. As the project struggled to sell condo units, Peebles and El-Ad filed lawsuits against each other, with Peebles suing to have El-Ad buy out his stake in the troubled project. As of February 2021, there were dozens of unsold units listed for sale.

5th & I - Washington, D.C. (Award Cancelled)

In 2019, Peebles was unable to complete a project awarded by RFP in Washington D.C. at 5th and I. In 2014, Peebles was selected to redevelop Fifth and Eye, a parcel in Washington, D.C.'s burgeoning Mount Vernon Triangle neighborhood, into a nearly 250,000-square-foot project to include a boutique hotel and branded residences. Peebles and the Mayor of Washington D.C. sparred publicly over the project and Peebles attempt to move the affordable housing component to a less desirable part of town on a parking lot owned by Peebles. Peebles was sued by his partner, Walker Group, after the project collapsed. Peebles project was plagued by financing shortfalls. The Fifth and I project was called a "debacle" by Washington D.C. press. This lawsuit by Washington D.C. was unrelated to the District's 2010 lawsuit against Peebles.

Massachusetts Back Bay, Boston, Mass. (Delayed)

In 2015, the Massachusetts Bay Transportation Authority and Massachusetts Department of Transportation chose Peebles for the development of an intersection in Boston's historic Back Bay neighborhood. Plans for the proposed $330 million, 390,000-square-foot project include a hotel, condominiums, rental apartments, retail, and a Hynes MBTA station. As of February 2021, the "long delayed" project had not been approved and Peebles cited the need for more funding and more air rights to allow the project to continue.

Family Court Building - Philadelphia, PA (Award Cancelled)

Peebles was anticipating developing Family Court Building, however, the city of Philadelphia cancelled the contract due to Peebles inability to begin construction after years of delays and millions of dollars in government grants. The project would have renovated the historic neo-classical former courthouse on 1801 Vine Street in Philadelphia's Logan Circle, into a boutique hotel. Officially, the City of Philadelphia cancelled the project after a "lack of substantial progress".

Bath Club - Miami, FL (Completed)

The company's Miami and Miami Beach projects include a 900,000-square-foot mixed-use project in Downtown Miami and The Bath Club Estates. In February 2021, a Miami-dad County Judge sanctioned Peebles in the amount of $1 million. The Judge found Peebles liable for failing to keep the Bath Club in first class condition, requiring $1,000 per day restitution for a period spanning nearly three years.

Brooklyn Village - Charlotte, NC (Delayed)

In 2016, Charlotte's Mecklenburg County selected Peebles and Conformity Corporation for the development of Brooklyn Village, a development site consisting of 16 acres located in the neighborhood within Uptown Charlotte, NC. The proposed project is planned to be a 2.3 million square foot "urban village", and will be constructed over multiple phases.

Angel's Landing - Los Angeles, CA (Pending Site Plan Approvals)

In December 2017, Peebles, as part of the three-team development partnership Angels Landing Partners, was unanimously approved to redevelop the Bunker Hill site in Downtown Los Angeles, dubbed Angels Landing. The estimated $1.2 billion development will include residential, hotel, retail, and communal spaces distributed over two towers. The main tower, when constructed, would reach at least 80 stories and would be divided into three parts: hotel, apartments, and condominiums. A 192-room SLS hotel with its own swimming pool would be below 425 apartments (including some subsidized affordable units), on top of which would be 250 condominiums and another swimming pool. The second tower would reach 27 stories and would contain a charter elementary school and a 289-room Mondrian hotel that offers a rooftop pool and bar. Project completion is estimated to be around late 2024.

In October, 2022, Peebles Corporation posted a public letter declaring that they would not work with Los Angeles City Council Member De Leon. De Leon was in a meeting where derogatory comments were made about a colleague's son, with calls for De Leon's resignation made by the California Governor, Newsom.

Council Member De Leon's office responded by calling Peebles' letter a "deeply cynical ploy" and that the delays were in fact caused by The Peebles Corporation's inability to move the project forward: “The notion that any delays of this project are due to the councilmember and not the developer’s inability to provide a proposal that meets the standards of the City of Los Angeles and the California Redevelopment Agency is outrageous. Despite this deeply cynical ploy to give themselves a favorable advantage in negotiations, the council office is committed to continue to work with other city offices toward an agreement that brings a mixed-use project to this long vacant site; following our policy of substantially increasing the provision of affordable housing in all major projects.”

Peebles has publicly and expressly stated "racism has impeded our progress" in Los Angeles, despite prior assurances that the project would on time and was meeting all deadlines to be open for the 2028 Olympics.

Site K - New York, NY (Cancelled; RFP rescinded)

In October 2021, Peebles press releases and statements announced he submitted bid documents for a skyscraper to be built at Site K, near Javitz Center, in New York City. On December 21, 2021, Governor Hochul and the Empire State Development Corporation, announced that it was rescinding the RFP in order to accommodate affordable housing. The Peebles proposal included no residential element, and specifically, no affordable housing component.

Peebles Real Estate Fund

Peebles has been unsuccessful in attracting investment for a real estate fund for the better part of a decade.

In 2011, Peebles distributed offering materials for a real estate investment fund, but was unable to attract investors.

In 2018, Peebles announced his corporation was starting a $500,000,000 real estate fund for women and minority developers.

Although in July 2020, Peebles announced that the fund was ready to deploy capital, Peebles later admitted he was unable to attract capital. Despite not having investors, Peebles claimed the fund would begin investing in women- and minority-owned projects by the end of the year. In August 2021, Peebles announced he had not been able to obtain funding for the fund, citing an inability to attract investors.

In January 2021, Peebles admitted he was unable to attract investors despite earlier claims that he would be deploying capital by the end of 2020.

References

External links

Real estate investment trusts of the United States
Real estate services companies of the United States
Real estate companies established in 1983
Financial services companies established in 1983
Investment management companies of the United States
Mortgage industry companies of the United States
Property management companies